Zideh (also: Ziddi) is a jamoat in Tajikistan. It is located in Varzob District, one of the Districts of Republican Subordination. The jamoat has a total population of 7,219 (2015). It consists of 7 villages: Kalon (the seat), Hazora, Kukteppa, Namozgoh, Nasrud, Obi Khirf, Panjkhok.

References

Populated places in Districts of Republican Subordination
Jamoats of Tajikistan